Davella is an unincorporated community located in Martin County, Kentucky, United States.

A post office was established in 1902 with Dave Delong as the postmaster. The town was named after Delong and his wife Ella.

References

Unincorporated communities in Martin County, Kentucky
Unincorporated communities in Kentucky